(–)-α-Terpineol synthase (EC 4.2.3.111) is an enzyme with systematic name geranyl-diphosphate diphosphate-lyase [cyclizing, (–)-α-terpineol-forming]. This enzyme catalyses the following chemical reaction

 geranyl diphosphate + H2O  (–)-α-terpineol + diphosphate

The enzyme has been characterized from Vitis vinifera (grape).

References

External links 
 

EC 4.2.3